Li Wenke (born July 1956) is a former Chinese politician who served as vice-chairman of the Liaoning People's Congress.  He was investigated in February 2017 by the Chinese Communist Party's anti-graft agency, suspected of corruption.

Career
Li was born in Suizhong County, Liaoning. He joined the workforce in 1974, and became a member of the Communist Party in 1985. From 1978 to 1982, he studied in Shenyang Agricultural University. Li became the Director of Department of Agriculture of Liaoning in 1998, and became the Mayor of Yingkou in 2001. In 2004, he served as the Party Secretary of Tieling. Li was appointed as vice-chairman of the Liaoning People's Congress in 2012.

On February 28, 2017, Li Wenke was suspected of "serious violations of party discipline", and placed under investigation by the Central Commission for Discipline Inspection (CCDI). On May 10, 2017, Li was expelled from the Communist Party.

On September 13, 2018, Li was sentenced on 16 years in prison and fined three million yuan for taking bribes worth 36.59 million yuan and giving bribes worth 1.86 million yuan by the Intermediate People's Court in Tonghua.

References

1956 births
Living people
People's Republic of China politicians from Liaoning
Chinese Communist Party politicians from Liaoning
Expelled members of the Chinese Communist Party
Politicians from Huludao